Daniel Frank Barron-Sullivan (born 9 June 1960 in Kuching, Sarawak) is an Australian former politician.

Political career
He was a Liberal member and later an independent member of the Western Australian Legislative Assembly representing the electorate of Mitchell now known as the electorate of Leschenault from December 1996 to September 2008. From 2001 to 2005, Sullivan was the Western Australian Liberal deputy leader, under the leadership of briefly Richard Court and then Colin Barnett.

Sullivan quit the Liberal Party in 2008 after losing his seat in an electoral redistribution and expressed dissatisfaction with current Liberal party leader Troy Buswell. On 20 June 2008, he created a new party by merging with the WA Family First party to create the WAFamilyFirst.com Party (the 'new' party continued to operate as the WA branch of Family First, Australia).

In the 2008 election, Sullivan ran for the South-West Region seat in the Legislative Council but only managed to attract 3% of the vote, and consequently was unsuccessful in his attempt to get reelected.

References

1960 births
Living people
Members of the Western Australian Legislative Assembly
Independent members of the Parliament of Western Australia
Family First Party politicians
Liberal Party of Australia members of the Parliament of Western Australia
People from Kuching
Malaysian emigrants to Australia
21st-century Australian politicians
People who lost Malaysian citizenship
Naturalised citizens of Australia